Singapore Airlines Flights 23 and 24 (SQ23/SIA23 and SQ24/SIA24, respectively) are the longest regularly scheduled non-stop flights in the world, operated by Singapore Airlines between Singapore Changi Airport and New York–JFK.

The route launched on 9 November 2020.

The flights originally used an Airbus A350-900. On January 16, 2021, the route was changed to operate using an Airbus A350-900ULR.

See also
Singapore Airlines Flights 21 and 22
Longest flights

References

Commercial flights
Transport-related lists of superlatives
Longest things